A step chair, also called a ladder chair, a library chair, a convertible chair or a Franklin chair, is a piece of furniture which folds to become either a chair or a small set of steps or stairs. Building one (usually in the diagonal-side-cut style) is a popular DIY project.

It is sometimes claimed that these chairs were designed by Benjamin Franklin. Franklin himself preferred to sit in a step chair he designed for his own library. This chair folded in a slightly different way from the common diagonal-side-cut step chair; the seat flips up, resting against the reclined back of the chair, and forming three steps; one formerly hidden under and parallel to the seat, and two attached vertically along the seat's front edge and midline.

A variant form has a third position, in which the back of the chair becomes an ironing-board. This design was common in the 1700s, but was revived in the 1990s. It has been described as suitable for small apartments. Its design is sometimes attributed to Thomas Jefferson, and thus called a Jefferson chair. This type is also known as three-in-one chair, bachelor chair, or onit chair.

See also
 Monks bench
 Metamorphic library steps

References

External Links
 

Chairs
Stairs
Mechanical furniture